Folke Hauger Johannessen (2 December 1913 – 17 April 1997) was a Norwegian military officer, an admiral of the Royal Norwegian Navy. He served as Chief of Defence of Norway from 1964 to 1972.

During World War II he was the deputy commander and commander of several Norwegian destroyers and a chief of an Escort Group in Convoy Service for the Allies in the North Atlantic.

Hauger Johannessen was decorated with the Grand Cross of the Order of St. Olav in 1972. He received the Grand Cross of the Danish Order of the Dannebrog and the Order of the Lion of Finland. He was a Commander of the American Legion of Merit.

References

1913 births
1997 deaths
People from Gothenburg
Royal Norwegian Navy personnel of World War II
Royal Norwegian Navy admirals
Norwegian memoirists
Commanders of the Legion of Merit
Grand Crosses of the Order of the Dannebrog
Commanders Grand Cross of the Order of the Lion of Finland
Chiefs of Defence (Norway)
20th-century Norwegian writers
20th-century memoirists
Swedish emigrants to Norway